The Traveling Companion and Other Plays is a collection of experimental plays written by American playwright Tennessee Williams and published by New Directions and in New York City in 2008. It is edited by Williams scholar Annette J. Saddik, who provides the introduction.

The majority of the plays are from the last decades of Williams's life, and are markedly different from those for which he is most known, departing from Southern locales, melodrama and naturalism, and showing the influence of Noh theatre and the Theatre of the Absurd. The plays have never before been collected and some are previously unpublished.

Plays 
 The Chalky White Substance
 The Day on Which a Man Dies (An Occidental Noh Play)
 A Cavalier for Milady
 The Pronoun "I"
 The Remarkable Rooming-House of Mme. Le Monde
 Kirche, Kueche, Kinder (An Outrage for the Stage)
 Green Eyes
 The Parade, or Approaching the End of a Summer
 The One Exception
 Sunburst
 Will Mr. Merriweather Return from Memphis?
 The Traveling Companion

See also
 List of one-act plays by Tennessee Williams

References

Extended reading 
 New Directions page
 New Directions Publishing Corporation

Plays by Tennessee Williams
2008 anthologies
Books of plays
New Directions Publishing books